Nadolice may refer to:
Nadolice Małe, Klein Nädlitz/Naedlitz, Nädlau, Gmina Czernica, Poland
Nadolice Wielkie, Groß Nädlitz/Gross Naedlitz, Nädlingen, Gmina Czernica, Poland